William Robert Charles Jarvis (1 October 1871 – 15 August 1939) was an Australian politician.

He was born in Hobart. In 1906 he was elected to the Tasmanian House of Assembly as the member for East Hobart. He stood for Denison with the introduction of proportional representation in 1909, but was defeated. He died in 1939 in Hobart.

References

1871 births
1939 deaths
Members of the Tasmanian House of Assembly
Politicians from Hobart